Obsidian is a knowledge base and note-taking software application that operates on Markdown files. It allows users to make internal links for notes and then to visualize the connections as a graph. It is designed to help users organize and structure their thoughts and knowledge in a flexible, non-linear way. The software is free for personal use, with commercial licenses available for pay. Obsidian is popular among writers, researchers, academics, and other professionals who need a flexible and powerful note-taking tool.

History 

Obsidian was founded by Shida Li and Erica Xu while quarantining during the COVID-19 pandemic. Li and Xu, who had met while studying at the University of Waterloo, had already collaborated on several development projects. Obsidian was initially released on 30 March 2020. Version 1.0.0 was released in October 2022. Version 1.1, which adds the Canvas core plugin, was released in December 2022.

Features 

Obsidian is built on Electron. It is a cross-platform application that runs on Windows, Linux, and macOS, as well as mobile operating systems such as Android and iOS. There is no web-based version of the software. Obsidian can be customized by adding plugins, which are also accessible from the mobile app. Obsidian differentiates between core plugins, which are released and maintained by the Obsidian team, and community plugins, which are contributed by users. Examples of community plugins include a Kanban-style task board and a calendar widget.

Obsidian operates on a folder of text documents; each new note in Obsidian generates a new text document. Obsidian allows for internal linking between notes, and creates an interactive graph which visualizes the relationships between notes. Text-formatting in Obsidian is achieved through Markdown, but Obsidian allows for the instantaneous previewing of formatted text.

Obsidian's customer support is accessible only through email. The developers, however, have hosted an Internet forum and a Discord channel where users can exchange solutions and ideas.

Some of the key features of Obsidian include:

 Wiki-style backlinks, which allow users to create links between notes and create connections between different pieces of information.
 Multi-level bullet points to create hierarchical lists.
 Embedded images and other media.
 Table of contents, which allows users to quickly navigate through headings in notes.
 Cross-platform support, which allows users to use Obsidian on different operating systems.
 Plugins support, which enables users to extend the functionality of Obsidian with additional features or integration with other tools.

Pricing 

Obsidian is free for personal, non-commercial use, although access to early builds can be purchased for a one-time, US$25 fee. Also available for purchase is Obsidian's built-in data synchronization service, as well as a built-in Internet publishing service.

The commercial license costs US$50 per user, per year, and includes prioritized customer support.

See also

References

External links 
 Obsidian plugins
 Official Obsidian forum
 Obsidian at SourceForge

Note-taking software
Wiki software
Android (operating system) software
IOS software
MacOS software
Windows software